PB-27 Kech-III is a constituency of the Provincial Assembly of Balochistan.

See also 
 PB-26 Kech-II
 PB-28 Kech-IV

References

External links 

 Election commission Pakistan's official website
 Awazoday.com check result
 Balochistan's Assembly official site

Constituencies of Balochistan